PT Digital Aplikasi Solusi, traded as Digiserve (formerly known as PT Teltranet Aplikasi Solusi or Telkomtelstra),  is a telecommunications company based in Jakarta, Indonesia. It was formed as a joint venture between Telkom Indonesia, the nation's largest fixed-line operator, and Australian telecommunications company, Telstra. Digiserve offers managed network services, WAN optimisation, managed cloud services, software as a service, infrastructure as a service, platform as a service, unified communication and collaboration services, managed security services, and professional services. The joint venture was formed in October 2014, and has over 100 employees.

History 

The birth of Digiserve (then known as telkomtelstra) came from an initial meeting and MOU between two companies, Telkom Indonesia and Telstra, an Australian company. The joint venture agreement was finalized between the two companies’ parents on 29 August 2014. The idea was to select and jointly share specialised resources of the two companies in order to create a new joint venture to be the exclusive provider of network application services (NAS) to business clients in Indonesia, South-East Asia’s largest economy.

PT Teltranet Aplikasi Solusi (telkomtelstra) was established by notarial deed No. 36 in Jakarta. The deed of establishment was approved by the Minister of Justice of the Republic of Indonesia in his decision letter No AHU-31520.40.10.2014, dated October 27, 2014. Since its foundation, it has expanded to include a range of different services, and has been awarded “the most innovative partnership award” by the IDC.

On 30 September 2021, Telkomtelstra was rebranded as Digiserve after Telkom acquired Telstra's remaining shares.

Services Provided 
Digiserve provides network application services across Indonesia, and is, per its agreement, the exclusive provider of these services in the country. As of today, the services they offer include:

Managed Network Services – Digiserve provides management services for the communication networks of both multinational and domestic companies.

Managed Cloud Services - Digiserve offers on-demand services to companies via the internet from cloud systems as opposed to on-premises servers.

Software as a Service - Also known as software on demand, Digiserve hosts subscription-based software services.

Unified Communication and Collaboration - Digiserve helps companies overcome challenges by bringing all communications into one place, and providing communication services for personnel.

Managed Security Services - Services that aim to protect a company, and the sensitive information of customers from attacks and leaks.

Professional Services - Consultation services including project management and assessment.

Awards
 Innovation in Events, Silver Stevie Winner, 2016

References

External links 
 
 telkomtelstra Launch Highlights

Telecommunications companies of Indonesia
Telecommunications companies established in 2014
Companies based in Jakarta
Indonesian companies established in 2014
Telkom Indonesia